Coombe Hill is a hamlet in the civil parish of Leigh in Gloucestershire, England.
  It lies on the A38 road between Gloucester and Tewkesbury, at the junction with the A4019 road to Cheltenham.

It is now a nature reserve.

References

Hamlets in Gloucestershire
Borough of Tewkesbury